Saint-Éloy may refer to places in France:
Saint-Eloy, Finistère
Saint-Éloy-d'Allier
Saint-Éloy-de-Gy, Cher
Saint-Éloy-la-Glacière, Puy-de-Dôme
Saint-Éloy-les-Mines, Puy-de-Dôme
Saint-Éloy-les-Tuileries, Corrèze

See also
 St. Eloi (Ypres), Belgium
 Sint-Elooi, Belgium

fr:Saint-Éloi